William Cooper (December 2, 1754 – December 22, 1809) was an American merchant, land speculator and developer, the founder of Cooperstown, New York. A politician, he was appointed as a county judge and later served two terms in the United States Congress, representing Otsego County and central New York. He was the father of James Fenimore Cooper, who became a noted writer of historical novels related to the New York frontier.

Life
William Cooper was born in 1754 in a log house in Smithfield (now Somerton) in the Province of Pennsylvania, just outside Philadelphia, the son of English Quaker parents,James Cooper (b. Byberry, Philadelphia, 1729–1795) and Hannah (Hibbs) Cooper. He appears to have first worked as a wheelwright in and around Byberry. There is no record of his attending school. He later settled in Burlington, New Jersey, a Quaker city.

Marriage and family
On December 12, 1774, in Burlington, he was married by a civil magistrate to Elizabeth Fenimore, daughter of Richard Fenimore, a Quaker of Rancocas.

Career
During the early 1780s, Cooper became a storekeeper in Burlington, New Jersey, located along the Delaware River. By the end of the decade, he was a successful land speculator and wealthy frontier developer in what is now Otsego County, New York. Soon after the conclusion of the Revolutionary War, he acquired a tract of land several thousand acres in extent within the borders of New York state and lying along the head waters of the Susquehanna River at Otsego Lake. He founded the Village of Otsego at the foot of the lake in 1786, creating a traditional plan for the village inspired by that of Burlington. He moved his family there, arriving on November 10, 1790. The judge and other investors also founded De Kalb, New York, near the east end of Lake Ontario and the St. Lawrence River, in 1803, platting approximately 64,000 acres and selling the parcels on. His brother James took care of the holdings, which were tied up in litigation for years, both before and after the death of Judge Cooper in 1809. The Cooper family holdings were all gone by 1817. In 1852 a village was named Cooper's Falls north of De Kalb. James stayed in the area, and his son William grew up in De Kalb and was a carpenter. The existing De Kalb Historical Society building was built by the judge's nephew, William, and some of his descendants may still live in the area.

After 1791, when Otsego County was split off from Montgomery County, Cooper was appointed as a county judge. He was later elected to two terms in Congress, representing the Federalist Party in the 4th (March 4, 1795 – March 3, 1797) and the 6th United States Congresses (March 4, 1799 – March 3, 1801).

In 1796, Cooper determined to make his home permanently in the town he had founded, which by that time promised to become a thriving settlement. It attracted many land-hungry migrants from New England. He began the construction of a mansion, completed in 1799, which he named Otsego Hall. For many years it served as his manor house; it was by far the most spacious and stately private residence in central New York.

Cooper family tradition has it that Judge Cooper was killed by a blow to the head sustained during an argument with a political opponent after a public meeting in Albany, New York on December 22, 1809. No evidence of this can be found, and the story appeared to arise in 1897. A great-grandson of the judge published this account, which historians consider implausible. They believe that Judge Cooper died of natural causes.

Cooper was buried at the Episcopal Christ Churchyard in Cooperstown. His son James Fenimore Cooper, a popular author of historical novels, was buried there many years later.

A great-grandson, Paul F. Clark, became a Nebraska State Representative. A 2xgreat-grandson, writer Paul Fenimore Cooper, is known for the children's adventure, Tal: His Marvelous Adventures with Noom-Zor-Noom (1929, reprint 1957 and 2001).

Legacy and honors

Cooperstown was named for him, as he was the founder.

References
William Cooper, "How Settlements were Promoted", from A Guide in the Wilderness, 1810
James Fenimore Cooper (1858-1938, grandson of the author), "William Cooper and Andrew Craig's Purchase of Croghan's Land", New York History, October 1931
Lyman H. Butterfield, "Judge William Cooper (1754-1809): A Sketch of his Character and Accomplishment", New York History, October 1949
Lyman H. Butterfield, "Cooper's Inheritance: The Otsego Country and its Founders", New York History, October 1954
David M. Ellis, "The Coopers and New York State Landholding Systems", New York History, October 1954]
James H. Pickering, "Cooper's Otsego Heritage: The Sources of The Pioneers", New York History, July 1979
Alan Taylor, "Who Murdered William Cooper?", New York History, July 1991
Alan Taylor, "Who was Elizabeth Cooper?", New York History, Autumn 1994
Alan Taylor, William Cooper's Town: Power and Persuasion on the Frontier of the Early American Republic, New York: Alfred A. Knopf, 1995 (Pulitzer Prize winner for History)
James M. Banner, Jr., "Cooper, William", from American National Biography, Oxford University Press, Inc., 2000

External links
 
 

1754 births
1809 deaths
Politicians from Philadelphia
People of colonial Pennsylvania
American people of English descent
American Quakers
Federalist Party members of the United States House of Representatives from New York (state)
New York (state) state court judges
American city founders
People from Cooperstown, New York